This is a list of colleges and universities in the U.S. state of Nevada. The higher education system of Nevada is composed primarily of public two and four-year institutions, private four-year institutions and two and four-year for-profit schools. The largest college in the state is the College of Southern Nevada with over 37,000 students.

The eight public institutions are under the control of the Nevada System of Higher Education (NSHE) (formerly the University and Community College System of Nevada "UCCSN") and are divided into comprehensive colleges and community colleges. An unusual characteristic of the community colleges is that they award bachelor's degrees in recognition of the limited resources of the state.

The oldest college in the state is the University of Nevada, Reno was founded in 1874 in Elko, Nevada as a political compromise and later became a Morrill Act Land Grant institution. Following a period of inactivity, the college was re-founded in Reno, Nevada in 1886. In 1951, an extension campus was created in Las Vegas, Nevada. In 1957, the extension became the University of Nevada, Las Vegas. In 1971, the College of Southern Nevada was founded to serve the growing population of Nevada. The most recent public college is Nevada State College in Henderson, Nevada, which was founded in 2002.

The private colleges of Nevada are divided into non-profit and for-profit institutions, with several branches of national for-profit institutions such as the University of Phoenix.

Public colleges and universities

Private, nonprofit colleges and universities

For-profit colleges and universities

See also

 Higher education in the United States
 List of college athletic programs in Nevada
 List of American institutions of higher education
 List of colleges and universities
 List of colleges and universities by country
 List of recognized higher education accreditation organizations
 Nevada System of Higher Education

References

External links
 Department of Education listing of accredited institutions in Nevada

Education in Nevada
Nevada
Universities and colleges